Desulfosarcina  is a Gram-negative and strictly anaerobic bacteria genus from the family of Desulfosarcinaceae.

References

Further reading 
 
 

Desulfobacterales
Bacteria genera